Kfar HaHoresh is a kibbutz in northern Israel. Located near Nazareth, it falls under the jurisdiction of Jezreel Valley Regional Council. 

History
A nearby archaeological site dating to the Pre-Pottery Neolithic B period has been under excavation since the early 1990s.

The kibbutz was established in 1933 by members of the Gordonia youth movement who had previously been living in Ness Ziona. The land had been bought by the Jewish National Fund in 1930. Today the kibbutz has been privatized. The Arabic-language radio station Radio A-Shams broadcasts from the kibbutz.

Sport
The kibbutz fielded a football team, which competed in Liga Meuhedet in 1949–50; the team finished eighth in the league's North Division.

Notable people
Ephraim Kishon

References

Kibbutzim
Kibbutz Movement
Populated places established in 1933
1933 establishments in Mandatory Palestine
Populated places in Northern District (Israel)